Brad Pitt (born December 18, 1963) is an American actor and producer. His acting career began at age 24 in 1987 with roles in the hit Fox television series 21 Jump Street. He subsequently appeared in episodes for television shows during the late 1980s and played his first major role in the slasher film Cutting Class (1989). He gained recognition in Thelma & Louise (1991) and A River Runs Through It (1992). He later took on the role of vampire Louis de Pointe du Lac in the horror drama Interview with the Vampire (1994) and for his performance in the epic drama Legends of the Fall (1994), he earned his first Golden Globe Award for Best Actor nomination.

Pitt starred in the David Fincher-directed, commercially successful thriller Seven (1995), in which he played a detective on the trail of a serial killer who murders people he believes are guilty of the Seven Deadly Sins. His performance as a psychotic mental patient in the science fiction film 12 Monkeys won him the Golden Globe Award for Best Supporting Actor and an Academy Award nomination in the same category. He followed it with the role of Heinrich Harrer in the biopic Seven Years in Tibet (1997) and as Death in Meet Joe Black (1998). Pitt reteamed with Fincher to star in the apocalyptic film Fight Club (1999) as anti-consumerist cult leader Tyler Durden, a role that required him to learn boxing, taekwondo, and grappling. A critical and commercial disappointment at the time of release, the film has since developed a cult status. Pitt portrayed Rusty Ryan in the commercially successful heist film series Ocean's Trilogy (2001–07). In 2002, he earned a Primetime Emmy Award nomination for his guest appearance in the sitcom Friends alongside his then-wife Jennifer Aniston. Also that year, Pitt started a production company, Plan B Entertainment, whose first release was the epic war film Troy (2004), starring Pitt. He played an assassin opposite Angelina Jolie in the commercially successful action comedy Mr. & Mrs. Smith (2005).

Pitt produced the 2006 crime drama The Departed, and starred alongside Cate Blanchett in the multi-narrative drama Babel (2006); the former won the Academy Award for Best Picture. Pitt's portrayal of the eponymous man who ages in reverse in the drama The Curious Case of Benjamin Button (2008) earned him an Academy Award for Best Actor nomination. He starred in the successful war film Inglourious Basterds (2009), and produced the superhero film Kick-Ass (2010) and its sequel in 2013. In 2011, he earned critical acclaim for producing and starring in two films—the experimental drama The Tree of Life and the biopic sports drama Moneyball—both of which were nominated for the Academy Award for Best Picture. He also garnered a Best Actor nomination for the latter. His biggest commercial success came with the apocalyptic film World War Z (2013), which has grossed a total of $540 million worldwide. Pitt produced the period drama 12 Years a Slave (2013), for which he won the Academy Award for Best Picture. In 2014, he starred in the war film Fury which received positive reviews from critics and proved to be successful at the box office. For playing a stunt double to Leonardo DiCaprio's character in Quentin Tarantino's film Once Upon a Time in Hollywood (2019), he won an Academy Award, a Golden Globe Award, and a BAFTA Award for Best Actor in a Supporting Role.

Film

Television

Theatre

See also
 List of awards and nominations received by Brad Pitt

References

External links
 

Male actor filmographies
American filmographies
Filmography